James McAnearney (20 March 1935 – 14 March 2017) was a Scottish football player and manager.

McAnearney played for Sheffield Wednesday, Plymouth Argyle, Watford and Bradford City, who he also briefly managed in 1968 with Tom Hallett. He later managed Rotherham United, Frickley Athletic, Scarborough and Hallam, and worked as a coach at Sheffield Wednesday (where he was also caretaker manager) and Leeds United. In later life he established and ran a tool/engineering business.

Early and personal life
McMcAnearney was born in Dundee. His older brother Tom was also a professional footballer.

Club career
After playing for St Stephen's, McAnearney signed for Sheffield Wednesday in October 1951, at the same time as older brother Tom, and turned professional on his seventeenth birthday. He made his professional debut on 24 February 1954, scoring 10 goals in 40 games in all competitions, and spending a total of eight years with the club.

He signed for Plymouth Argyle in January 1960, scoring 37 goals in 147 games in all competitions, before leaving for Watford in November 1963. He moved to Bradford City in September 1966. He scored 5 goals in 50 games in all competitions for Bradford City.

He scored 68 goals in 304 league appearances.

Coaching career
He gained his full FA Coaching Badge in 1958, at the age of 23, one of the youngest players to do so. While playing for Bradford City spent a brief spell managing the club alongside Tom Hallett in early 1968, following the sudden death of manager Grenville Hair in March and before Jimmy Wheeler was appointed as the new permanent manager in June. He left Bradford to join Rotherham United in May 1968, initially as chief coach to Tommy Docherty, but then as manager between November 1968 and 1973. He later worked as a coach at Sheffield Wednesday (where he was also caretaker manager after the departure of Steve Burtenshaw) and Leeds United, and also managed Frickley Athletic, Scarborough and Hallam.

Later life
After his coaching career finished in the 1970s, McAnearney founded a tool engineering/machine company in Sheffield. He died on 14 March 2017, at the age of 81.

Sources

References

1935 births
2017 deaths
Footballers from Dundee
Scottish footballers
Sheffield Wednesday F.C. players
Plymouth Argyle F.C. players
Watford F.C. players
Bradford City A.F.C. players
English Football League players
Association football inside forwards
Scottish football managers
Bradford City A.F.C. managers
Rotherham United F.C. non-playing staff
Rotherham United F.C. managers
Sheffield Wednesday F.C. non-playing staff
Sheffield Wednesday F.C. managers
Leeds United F.C. non-playing staff
Frickley Athletic F.C. managers
Scarborough F.C. managers
Hallam F.C. managers